The 1997 Acura Classic was a women's tennis tournament held between August 4 through August 10, 1997. It was played on outdoor hard courts at the Manhattan Country Club in Manhattan Beach, California. The tournament was a WTA Tier II tournament of the 1997 WTA Tour.

Finals

Singles

 Monica Seles defeated  Lindsay Davenport 5–7, 7–5, 6–4
 It was Seles' 1st title of the year and the 43rd of her career.

Doubles

 Yayuk Basuki /  Caroline Vis defeated  Larisa Savchenko /  Helena Suková 7–6, 6–3
 It was Basuki's 1st title of the year and the 12th of her career. It was Vis' 1st title of the year and the 3rd of her career.

External links
 ITF tournament edition details
 Tournament draws

Acura Classic
LA Women's Tennis Championships
Sports competitions in Manhattan Beach, California
1997 in American tennis
1997 in sports in California